David Davis IV (July 29, 1906 – April 14, 1978) was an American lawyer and politician.

Davis was born in Bloomington, Illinois. His great-grandfather was David Davis, who served in the United States Senate and on the United States Supreme Court.

Davis attended Bloomington public schools and University High School. He received his bachelor's degree from Williams College and his law degree from University of South Dakota School of Law. Davis also attended to University of Illinois. He was admitted to the Illinois bar and opened his own law practice in Bloomington, Illinois, in 1932.

He served as Chairman of the Board of the National Bank of Bloomington from 1955 to 1977 and in the Illinois Senate from 1953 to 1967 as a Republican. He also served in the Illinois Constitutional Convention of 1969–1970.

In 1959, Davis gave the David Davis Mansion to the State of Illinois.

Davis died at the St. Francis Medical Center and Hospital in Peoria, Illinois.

The David Davis III & IV House, a site on the National Register of Historic Places in Bloomington, is named for Davis and his father.

Notes

External links

1906 births
1978 deaths
People from Bloomington, Illinois
Williams College alumni
University of South Dakota School of Law alumni
University of Illinois alumni
Businesspeople from Illinois
Farmers from Illinois
Illinois lawyers
Republican Party Illinois state senators
20th-century American politicians
20th-century American businesspeople
20th-century American lawyers